Narita is the second studio album by the American heavy metal band Riot. The album was initially released  in 1979. It became out of print in the late 1980s and was only being pressed in CD format in Japan in 1989 until the early 1990s. It was finally issued on CD outside Japan in 2005 by UK-based Rock Candy Records, run by former Kerrang! writers Derek Oliver and Dante Bonutto.

'Narita' was also the name of a short-lived San Antonio, Texas-based Riot offshoot, featuring guitarist Mark Reale along with former S.A. Slayer members vocalist Steve Cooper, drummer Dave McClain, and bassist Don Van Stavern, who would later appear on the Thundersteel and The Privilege of Power albums and is a member of Riot V. They recorded a three-song demo in 1985, including an early version of "Thundersteel", before Reale reformed Riot in 1986.

Track listing
All songs were written by Guy Speranza and Mark Reale except where noted.

Personnel

Riot 
Guy Speranza – vocals
 Mark Reale – guitar
 Rick Ventura – guitar
 Jimmy Iommi – bass
 Peter Bitelli – drums

Cover versions and appearances
 American metal band Night Demon covered "Road Racin'" on their 2015 album Curse of the Damned; the song is included on the CD digipak version on Century Media and the 12" vinyl version on SPV/Steamhammer.
 The songs "Narita" and "Road Racin are featured in the video game Brütal Legend.
 The song "Road Racin" was included on the Polydor album Castle Donnington: Monsters of Rock, from the concert August 1980.

See also
Narita International Airport（Sanrizuka Struggle）

References

Riot V albums
1979 albums
Capitol Records albums